Islamic School, Irbid (Arabic: المدرسة الاسلامية اربد) is a private islamic school, situated in Irbid, Jordan. It was opened in 1980, and has been steadily growing ever since. The school is split into two sections, boys and girls sections, boys under 5th grade are in the girls section. The school's teaching level reaches up to 10th grade. The school teaches the Jordanian system, Tawjihi.

History 
Islamic School, Irbid was established in Irbid in 1980 by the Muslim Brothers.

See also
Education in Jordan

References

External links
Website: Islamic Center
Wikimapia: Islamic School

Educational institutions established in 1980
Irbid
Islamic schools
Private schools in Jordan
Religious schools in Jordan